Stadt Hannover I (English: Hanover City 1) is an electoral constituency (German: Wahlkreis) represented in the Bundestag. It elects one member via first-past-the-post voting. Under the current constituency numbering system, it is designated as constituency 41. It is located in central Lower Saxony, comprising the northern part of the city of Hanover.

Stadt Hannover I was created for the inaugural 1949 federal election. Since 2021, it has been represented by Adis Ahmetovic of the Social Democratic Party (SPD).

Geography
Stadt Hannover I is located in central Lower Saxony. As of the 2021 federal election, it comprises the northern part of the city of Hanover, specifically the districts of Bothfeld-Vahrenheide, Buchholz-Kleefeld, Mitte (excluding Mitte and Calenberger Neustadt), Herrenhausen-Stöcken (excluding Herrenhausen), Misburg-Anderten, Nord (excluding Nordstadt), and Vahrenwald-List.

History
Stadt Hannover I was created in 1949, then known as Stadt Hannover-Nord. In the 1965 through 1976 elections, it was named Hannover I. It acquired its current name in the 1980 election. In the inaugural Bundestag election, it was Lower Saxony constituency 18 in the numbering system. From 1953 through 1961, it was number 40. From 1965 through 1998, it was number 36. In the 2002 and 2005 elections, it was number 41. In the 2009 election, it was number 42. Since the 2013 election, it has been number 41.

Originally, the constituency comprised the city quarters of Buchholz, Hainholz, Herrenhausen, Stöcken, List, Vahrenwald, and Mitte. In the 1965 through 1976 elections, it comprised the area of the city north of the Seelze–Hannover Hauptbahnhof–Lehrte railway line. It acquired its current borders in the 1980 election.

Members
The constituency has been held by the Social Democratic Party (SPD) during all but one Bundestag term since 1949. Its first representative was Bruno Leddin of the SPD, who served from 1949 until his death in 1951. Egon Franke won the resulting by-election, and served until 1957, when Adolf Cillien of the Christian Democratic Union (CDU) won the constituency. Franke won it back in 1961, and went on to serve until 1987. He was succeeded by Gerd Andres, who served from 1987 to 2009. Kerstin Tack was elected in 2009, and re-elected in 2013 and 2017. She was succeeded by Adis Ahmetovic in 2021.

Election results

2021 election

2017 election

2013 election

2009 election

References

Federal electoral districts in Lower Saxony
Hanover
1949 establishments in West Germany
Constituencies established in 1949